Charles de Laet Waldo Sibthorp (14 February 1783 – 14 December 1855), popularly known as Colonel Sibthorp, was a widely caricatured British Ultra-Tory politician in the early 19th century.  He sat as a Member of Parliament for Lincoln from 1826 to 1832 and from 1835 until 1855.

Sibthorp was born into a Lincoln gentry family, the son of Colonel Humphrey Waldo Sibthorp, of Canwick Hall, by his wife Susannah, daughter of Richard Ellison, of Sudbrooke Holme, Lincolnshire. Charles's brother, Richard Waldo Sibthorp (1792-1879), was an Anglican priest who gained notoriety for his 1841 conversion to Roman Catholicism (and who subsequently returned to the Anglican Church). He was commissioned into the Scots Greys in 1803, promoted Lieutenant in 1806, and later transferred to the 4th Dragoon Guards, in which he reached the rank of Captain. He did not serve abroad and continued in the service until 1822, when he succeeded to the family estates and also succeeded his brother as Lieutenant-Colonel of the Royal South Lincolnshire Militia.  In 1812, he married Maria, daughter and co-heiress of Ponsonby Tottenham, M.P. for Fethard, County Tipperary; they had four children.

Member of Parliament
During Sibthorp's three decades in Parliament, he became renowned, along with Sir Robert Inglis, as one of its most reactionary members. He stoutly opposed Catholic Emancipation, Emancipation of the Jews in England, the Reform Act of 1832, the repeal of the Corn Laws, the 1851 Great Exhibition and the construction of the National Gallery.  He was convinced that any changes from the Britain of his youth (in the late 18th century) were signs of degeneracy, that Britain was about to go bankrupt, and that the new railways were a passing fad which would soon give way to a return to "chaises, carriages and stages".

He was opposed to all foreign influences, and offended Queen Victoria with his public suspicions of Prince Albert, the prince consort.  His political views, his bluntness in expressing them, and his eccentricities made him the target of both witticisms and cartoons in Punch.

He was returned to Parliament on eight occasions.

Sibthorp died at his home in London, and was succeeded as MP by his son, Gervaise Waldo-Sibthorp.

Family

References

 S Roberts & M Acton "The Parliamentary Career of Charles De Laet Waldo Sibthorp 1826 - 55: Ultra Tory Opposition to reform in Nineteenth Century Britain" New York 2010.
 Dodds, John W. The Age of Paradox : A Biography of England, 1841-1851. Westport, Conn. : Greenwood, 1970 [1952].
 Michell, John. Eccentric Lives and Peculiar Notions, 1984 .
Attribution

External links 
 

1783 births
1855 deaths
Conservative Party (UK) MPs for English constituencies
Royal Scots Greys officers
4th Royal Irish Dragoon Guards officers
Royal Lincolnshire Regiment officers
British Militia officers
British Army personnel of the Napoleonic Wars
UK MPs 1826–1830
UK MPs 1830–1831
UK MPs 1831–1832
UK MPs 1835–1837
UK MPs 1837–1841
UK MPs 1841–1847
UK MPs 1847–1852
UK MPs 1852–1857
Politics of Lincoln, England
Ultra-Tory MPs